Zagrajec is a small village west of Ivanji Grad in the Municipality of Komen in the Littoral region of Slovenia.

References

External links
Zagrajec on Geopedia

Populated places in the Municipality of Komen